"The Ghost Sonata" is the fourth episode of Pretty Little Liars: The Perfectionists. It aired on Freeform on April 10, 2019. In the episode "The Perfectionists" as well as Alison and Mona begin digging deeper into Nolan's murder. The episode was written by Joseph Dougherty and directed by Roger Kumble. Overall the episode received mostly positive reviews but sparked criticism from viewers and critics from specific scenes.

Plot
Alison and Mona begin suspecting who the blonde girl in the cabin that Ava saw was. Ava, Caitlin, and Dylan are having coffee but is interrupted by Mason who blackmails them. Mona tells Alison that someone has modified the program she wrote and it has been changed to find a specific group of people. The program returns the names Caitlin's, Alison's, and Ray Hogadorn.

Dana meets with Ava and starts questioning her about money but the two are interrupted by Alison. Jeremy and Caitlin are both waiting to meet Claire and pretend like it's the first time they met. Caitlin tells Claire that she can't spy on Ava and Dylan and Claire doesn't take it well. Alison and Mona begin searching for Ray. While Ava, Caitlin, and Dylan are meeting again they see another message and assume it's from Mason. The three ask Alison for advice who tells them they should share their secrets with each other because they could keep them close. Andrew gets upset when he's in Dylan's apartment and finds a letter from a doctor saying he has a pinched nerve. This leads to a fight between Andrew and Dylan causing Andrew to leave.

Alison tells Mona that Emily stopped wearing her wedding ring and Mona tells her its time for her to move on. Ava gets Caitlin to meet with Mason so that they can find out if he's the one who killed Nolan but Mason blackmails Caitlin into getting them to rule him out as a suspect. Ava returns home and finds a music box on her bed playing music. Alison takes Mona's advice and signs the divorce papers Emily sent her. Caitlin visits Ava and tells her that shes the rat. The two talk before Ava yells at her to get out. Andrew comes back to Dylan's apartment and clears out all his stuff. Caitlin calls Jeremy and apologizes for lying to him.

Mona find a location for Ray and attempts to go find him. She finds a room full of newspaper clippings about Taylor's and Nolan's death before Ray enters the room and shuts the door behind him trapping Mona inside. Alison begins looking deeper for Taylor and finds a trailer in the woods. She begins to explore but is interrupted by Taylor who locks her inside the trailer and runs off.

Production

Development
Casting sessions for the episode and the following episode took place in late October 2018 between director Roger Kumble, co-executive producer and director Norman Buckley, as well as executive producer and writer Charlie Craig. The table read for the episode took place on October 30, 2018. Tech scouting for episodes four and five began on October 31, 2018; meanwhile actor Niki Koss shadowed both Kumble and Buckley during production of the two episodes. An additional production meeting took place on November 1, 2018. Filming for both episodes took place in November 2018 and concluded on November 21, 2018. Larry Reibman served as the episodes Director of Photography.

Casting
Noah Grey-Cabey and Klea Scott both reprised their roles for the third time as Mason and Dana Booker, respectively, after both being cast in recurring roles for the series. Meanwhile, Evan Bittencourt also reprised his role for the third time as Andrew after being cast in a recurring role as well. Duffy Epstein was cast as a guest star in the episode as Ray Hogodorn. Phillip Rhys was cast in a recurring role and made his first appearance in the episode.

Reception

Critical response
The scene featuring Alison signing divorce papers invoked a negative response from viewers of the series. Series star Sasha Pieterse stated about the scene "I trust Marlene and her vision. Alison will always love Emily and she will always love and be the best mom she can be to their girls". I. Marlene King, creator of both Pretty Little Liars and Pretty Little Liars: The Perfectionists, said "If you have an opportunity to watch the show it is explained truthfully and respectfully. It does mean the end of Emison. It’s a chapter of discovery". Also speaking on the scene, Andrea Reiher with TV Guide stated "If this spin-off takes off and runs for several seasons, it will be much more interesting if Alison can have a love life and that just won't work if her wife and kids are back in Pennsylvania". The episode debuted on the iTunes US TV Episodes Chart at #15 and has remained on the chart since the episode's airing.

Viewing figures
The episode was watched live by 0.31 million viewers, up from the previous two episodes but still down from the premiere episode.

References

External links
 

2019 American television episodes